The 2011 FINA Swimming World Cup was a series of seven, two-day, short course meets in seven different cities in October and November 2011. Arena was again the title sponsor for the series, with Omega serving as official timer.

Meets
The 2011 World Cup consisted of the following seven meets:

World Cup standings

Men
Official overall scoring:

Women
Official overall scoring:

(*) including 20 points for WR bonus

Event winners

50 m freestyle

100 m freestyle

200 m freestyle

400 m freestyle

1500 m (men)/800 m (women) freestyle

50 m backstroke

100 m backstroke

200 m backstroke

50 m breaststroke

100 m breaststroke

200 m breaststroke

50 m butterfly

100 m butterfly

200 m butterfly

100 m individual medley

200 m individual medley

400 m individual medley

Legend:

References

FINA Swimming World Cup
FINA Swimming World Cup